An election to Dorset County Council took place on 2 May 2013 as part of the United Kingdom local elections. 45 councillors were elected from 42 electoral divisions, which returned either one or two county councillors each by first-past-the-post voting for a four-year term of office. The electoral divisions were the same as those used at the previous election in 2009. No elections were held in Bournemouth or Poole, which are unitary authorities outside the area covered by the County Council. The election saw the Conservative Party maintain overall control of the council.

All locally registered electors (British, Irish, Commonwealth and European Union citizens) who were aged 18 or over on Thursday 2 May 2013 were entitled to vote in the local elections. Those who were temporarily away from their ordinary address (for example, away working, on holiday, in student accommodation or in hospital) were also entitled to vote in the local elections, although those who had moved abroad and registered as overseas electors could not vote in the local elections. It is possible to register to vote at more than one address (such as a university student who had a term-time address and lives at home during holidays) at the discretion of the local Electoral Register Office, but it remains an offence to vote more than once in the same local government election.

Summary
The election saw the Conservatives maintain overall control of the council with a majority of 4 seats, a reduction of 1 seat. The Liberal Democrat group retained their status as the council's official opposition despite being reduced to 12 seats, down 4 seats. The Labour Party were the biggest winners, making their debut appearance in county hall with 5 seats. It was also the first time a UKIP candidate had been elected to the council. The council's only independent councillor lost his seat. No other parties achieved electoral representation on the council, though the Green Party did contest the election in a number of divisions.

Election result summary

|}

Election result by division

Beaminster

Blackmore Vale

Blandford

Bride Valley

Bridport

Broadwey

Burton Grange

Chickerell and Chesil Bank

Christchurch Central

Colehill and Stapehill

Commons

Corfe Mullen

Cranborne Chase

Dorchester

Edgdon Heath

Ferndown

Gillingham

Hambledon

Highcliffe and Walkford

Linden Lea

Lodmoor

Lytchett

Marshwood Vale

Minster

Mudeford and Highcliffe

Portland Harbour

Portland Tophill

Purbeck Hills

Rodwell

Shaftesbury

Sherborne

Sherborne Rural

St Leonards and St Ives

Stour Vale

Swanage

Three Valleys

Verwood and Three Legged Cross

Wareham

West Moors and Holt

Westham

Weymouth Town

Winterborne

By-elections between 2013 and 2017

Rodwell
A by-election was held for the Rodwell ward of Dorset County Council on 12 November 2015 following the resignation of Labour councillor Dan Brember due to work commitments.

Sherborne Rural
A by-election was held for the Sherborne Rural division of Dorset County Council on 2 June 2016 following the resignation of Conservative councillor Michael Bevan for health and family reasons.

Ferndown
A by-election was held for the Ferndown division of Dorset County Council on 1 September 2016 following the death of Conservative councillor John Wilson.

Another by-election was held for the Ferndown division of Dorset County Council on 1 December 2016 following the resignation of UKIP councillor Ian Michael Smith.

References

External links
Election Nominations - full list of nominated candidates, at Dorset County Council website

2013 English local elections
2013
2010s in Dorset